Disco Down may refer to one of the following:

"Disco Down", a single by Shed Seven from Going for Gold
"Disco Down", a song by Kylie Minogue from Light Years
"Disco Down", a song by The Flying Pickets from Lost Boys